The great horse manure crisis of 1894 refers to the idea that the greatest obstacle to urban development at the turn of the century was the difficulty of removing horse manure from the streets.  More broadly, it is an analogy for supposedly insuperable extrapolated problems being rendered moot by the introduction of new technologies. The phrase originates from a 2004 article by Stephen Davies entitled "The Great Horse-Manure Crisis of 1894".

The supposed problem of excessive horse-manure collecting in the streets was solved by the proliferation of cars, buses and electrified trams which replaced horses as the means of transportation in big cities. The term great horse manure crisis of 1894 is often used to denote a problem which seems to be impossible to solve because it is being looked at from the wrong direction. 

The name refers to a supposed 1894 publication in The Times, which said "In 50 years, every street in London will be buried under nine feet of manure". The reasoning was that more horses are needed to remove the manure, and these horses produce more manure. An urban planning conference in 1898 supposedly broke up before its scheduled end due to a failure to find an answer to this problem.  No such statement in the Times, nor conference result, is known, but in 1893 London there was a complaint that horse manure, formerly an economic good that could be sold, had become a disposal problem, an economic bad.

The supposed crisis has since taken on life as a useful analogy.

References

History of urban planning
Journalistic hoaxes
Fictional events